Tatsiana Kukhta (born 13 June 1990) is a Belarusian rower. She competed in the women's double sculls event at the 2016 Summer Olympics.

References

External links
 

1990 births
Living people
Belarusian female rowers
Olympic rowers of Belarus
Rowers at the 2016 Summer Olympics
Place of birth missing (living people)